The 2021–22 Goa Professional League was the 24th season of the Goa Professional League, the top football league in the Indian state of Goa, since its establishment in 1996.

Selvel Advertising Pvt Ltd is the title sponsor of Goa Professional League 2021–22 season. The Kolkata based media firm has signed a five-year deal with the state association for the sponsorship.

This season, the GPL is playing with 12 teams in a single leg, which will have 66 matches and all of them will broadcast on an OTT app and will also have Square Circle as digital partners. The matches of the league were played at Duler Stadium, Mapusa, through to the end of October 2021.

The second leg has been split into two sections – the GFA President's Super League and GFA President's Relegation League 2021-22, each consisting of six teams based on the standings of the first-leg performance of 12 teams.

Sporting Clube de Goa were defending champions.

During the regular season, international betting monitoring agencies red-flagged 12 matches for suspicious betting patterns.

Teams

Stadiums and locations
Matches were played at Duler Stadium in Mapusa, Chowgule Sports Complex in Margao, and Salvador do Mundo in Bardez.

Phase 1

Standings

Phase 2
 GFA President's Super League

GFA President's Relegation League

See also
2022–23 I-League 2nd Division
2021–22 season in state football leagues of India

References

Goa Professional League seasons